Rhodocactus bahiensis is a species of tree-like cactus that is endemic to the Brazilian state of Bahia. First described as Pereskia bahiensis, it was transferred to Rhodocactus in 2016. Like all species in the genus Rhodocactus, and unlike most cacti, it has persistent leaves. In its native locality, it is used to form hedges.

Description
The young twigs are green or reddish, and have a few stomata, mainly around the areoles. Mature stems develop grayish-brown bark. The areoles bear leaves (brachyblast leaves) along with spines.

In its native habitat, R. bahiensis flowers in the spring and summer, from October to April, and fruits in the autumn from March to June. It then loses its leaves in the winter dry season from about June to October.

Taxonomy
The species was first described by R. L. M. Gürke in 1897 as Pereskia bahiensis. Molecular phylogenetic studies suggested that when broadly circumscribed, Pereskia was not monophyletic, and consisted of three clades. In 2016, the genus Rhodocactus was revived for one of these clades, which included R. bahiensis.

Distribution and habitat
Rhodocactus bahiensis is endemic to the Brazilian state of Bahia, where it is found in caatinga, subtropical dry shrubland.

Conservation
Rhodocactus bahiensis has been assessed as Least Concern, with no major threats. It regenerates well after disturbance.

Uses
Rhodocactus bahiensis is used locally for hedges. Cuttings are planted densely to form an impenetrable hedge, which is cut regularly.

References

Pereskioideae
Endemic flora of Brazil
Cacti of South America
Flora of Bahia
Least concern plants
Taxonomy articles created by Polbot
Taxobox binomials not recognized by IUCN